Esther Phillips (born Esther Mae Jones; December 23, 1935 – August 7, 1984) was an American singer, best known for her R&B vocals. She rose to prominence in 1950, scoring several major R&B hits including "Double Crossing Blues" and "Mistrustin' Blues" under the moniker "Little Esther". In the 1960s, she achieved chart success with the country song "Release Me" and recorded in the pop, jazz, blues and soul genres. Phillips received a Grammy nomination for her single "Home Is Where the Hatred Is" in 1973 and her disco recording of "What a Diff'rence a Day Makes" was a major hit in 1975. She died from liver and kidney failure due to long-term drug abuse in 1984.

Biography

Early life 
Phillips was born Esther Mae Jones in Galveston, Texas, U.S. Her parents divorced during her adolescence, and she divided her time between her father, in Houston, and her mother, in the Watts section of Los Angeles. She was brought up singing in church and was reluctant to enter a talent contest at a local blues club, but her sister insisted. A mature singer at the age of 14, she won the amateur talent contest in 1949 at the Barrelhouse Club, owned by Johnny Otis. Otis was so impressed that he recorded her for Modern Records and added her to his traveling revue, the California Rhythm and Blues Caravan, billed as Little Esther. She later took the surname Phillips as her stage name, reportedly inspired by a sign at a gas station.

Early career 
Her first hit record was "Double Crossing Blues", with the Johnny Otis Quintette and the Robins (a vocal group), released in 1950 by Savoy Records, which reached number 1 on the Billboard R&B chart. She made several hit records for Savoy with the Johnny Otis Orchestra, including "Mistrusting Blues" (a duet with Mel Walker) and "Cupid's Boogie", both of which also went to number 1 that year. Four more of her records made the Top 10 in the same year: "Misery" (number 9), "Deceivin' Blues" (number 4), "Wedding Boogie" (number 6), and "Far Away Blues (Xmas Blues)" (number 6). Few female artists performing in any genre had such success in their debut year.

Phillips left Otis and the Savoy label at the end of 1950 and signed with Federal Records. But just as quickly as the hits had started, they stopped. She recorded more than thirty sides for Federal, but only one, "Ring-a-Ding-Doo", made the charts, reaching number 8 in 1952. Not working with Otis was part of her problem; the other part was her deepening dependence on heroin, to which she was addicted by the middle of the decade. 

In 1954, she returned to Houston to live with her father and recuperate. Short on money, she worked in small nightclubs around the South, punctuated by periodic hospital stays in Lexington, Kentucky, to treat her addiction. In 1962, Kenny Rogers discovered her singing at a Houston club and helped her get a contract with Lenox Records, owned by his brother Lelan.

Comeback 
Phillips eventually recovered enough to launch a comeback in 1962. Now billed as Esther Phillips instead of Little Esther, she recorded a country tune, "Release Me", with the producer Bob Gans. This went to number 1 on the R&B chart and number 8 on the pop chart. After several other minor R&B hits for Lenox, she was signed by Atlantic Records. Her cover of the Beatles' song "And I Love Him" nearly made the R&B Top 20 in 1965. The Beatles flew her to the UK for her first overseas performances.

She had other hits in the 1960s for Atlantic, such as the Jimmy Radcliffe song "Try Me", which featured a saxophone part by King Curtis (and is often mistakenly credited as the James Brown song of the same title), but she had no more chart-toppers. Her heroin dependence worsened, and she checked into a rehabilitation facility. There she met the singer Sam Fletcher. While undergoing treatment, she recorded some sides for Roulette in 1969, mostly produced by Lelan Rogers. On her release, she returned to Los Angeles and re-signed with Atlantic. Her friendship with Fletcher resulted in a performance engagement at Freddie Jett's Pied Piper club in late 1969, which produced the album Burnin'''. She performed with the Johnny Otis Show at the Monterey Jazz Festival in 1970.

 The 1970s and 1980s 

One of her biggest post-1950s triumphs was her first album for the Kudu label, From a Whisper to a Scream, in 1972. The lead track, "Home Is Where the Hatred Is", an account of drug use written by Gil Scott-Heron, was nominated for a Grammy Award. Phillips lost to Aretha Franklin, but Franklin presented the trophy to her, saying she should have won it instead.

In 1975, she released a disco-style update of Dinah Washington's "What a Diff'rence a Day Makes", her biggest hit single since "Release Me". It reached the Top 20 in the United States and the Top 10 in the UK Singles Chart. On November 8, 1975, she performed the song on an episode of NBC's Saturday Night (later called Saturday Night Live) hosted by Candice Bergen. The accompanying album of the same name became her biggest seller yet, with arranger Joe Beck on guitar, Michael Brecker on tenor sax, David Sanborn on alto sax, Randy Brecker on trumpet, Steve Khan on guitar and Don Grolnick on keyboards.

She continued to record and perform throughout the 1970s and early 1980s, completing seven albums for Kudu/CTI and four for Mercury Records, which signed her in 1977. Her first album for Mercury, You've Come a Long Way, Baby, was released that year; according to Village Voice critic Robert Christgau, "using Kudu producer Pee Wee Ellis and the basic Kudu formula—mixing blues and standards and rock with MOR and disco crossovers—she comes up with her most consistent album of the '70s."  

In 1983, she charted for the final time with "Turn Me Out" which reached number 85 on the R&B chart. She completed recording her final album, A Way To Say Goodbye a few months before her death; it was released by the Muse jazz label in 1986.

 Death 
Phillips died at UCLA Medical Center in Carson, California, in 1984, at the age of 48, from liver and kidney failure due to long-term drug abuse. Her funeral services were conducted by Johnny Otis. 

Originally buried in an unmarked pauper's grave at Lincoln Memorial Park in Compton, she was reinterred in 1985 in the Morning Light section at Forest Lawn Memorial Park, Hollywood Hills, in Los Angeles. A bronze marker recognizes her career achievements and quotes a Bible passage: "In My Father's House Are Many Mansions" (John 14:2).

 Rock and Roll Hall of Fame 
Phillips was twice nominated for the Rock and Roll Hall of Fame, in 1986 and 1987, but was not inducted.

 Grammy nominations 

 Discography 

 Albums 
{| class="wikitable"
!Year
!Title
!Label
! style="font-size:smaller" width="40"|US
! style="font-size:smaller" width="40"|USJazz
! style="font-size:smaller" width="40"|USR&B
! style="font-size:smaller" width="40"|AUS
|-
|1963
|Release Me|Lenox
|align="center"|46
|align="center"|
|align="center"|
|align="center"| -
|-
|1965
|And I Love Him!|rowspan="5"|Atlantic
|align="center"|
|align="center"|
|align="center"|
|align="center"| -
|-
|rowspan="2"|1966
|Esther Phillips Sings|align="center"|
|align="center"|
|align="center"|
|align="center"| -
|-
|The Country Side of Esther|align="center"|
|align="center"|
|align="center"|
|align="center"| -
|-
|rowspan="2"|1970
|Live at Freddie Jett's Pied Piper|align="center"|
|align="center"|
|align="center"|
|align="center"| -
|-
|Burnin' (Live)
|align="center"|115
|align="center"|12
|align="center"|7
|align="center"| -
|-
|rowspan="2"|1972
|From a Whisper to a Scream|Kudu/CTI
|align="center"|137
|align="center"|
|align="center"|16
|align="center"| -
|-
|Alone Again, Naturally|rowspan="4"|Kudu/CTI
|align="center"|177
|align="center"|15
|align="center"|26
|align="center"| -
|-
|1974
|Black-Eyed Blues|align="center"|205
|align="center"|15
|align="center"|17
|align="center"| -
|-
|rowspan="3"|1975
|Performance|align="center"|
|align="center"|27
|align="center"|46
|align="center"| -
|-
|Esther Phillips and Joe Beck|align="center"|
|align="center"|3
|align="center"|
|align="center"| -
|-
|What a Diff'rence a Day Makes|Kudu/CTI
|align="center"|32
|align="center"|
|align="center"|13
|align="center"|99
|-
|rowspan="3"|1976*
|Capricorn Princess|Kudu/CTI
|align="center"|150
|align="center"|23
|align="center"|40
|align="center"| -
|-
|Confessin' the Blues*
|Atlantic* (1966, 1970)     
|align="center"|170
|align="center"|26
|align="center"|35
|align="center"| -
|-
|For All We Know|Kudu/CTI
|align="center"|
|align="center"|32
|align="center"|33
|align="center"| -
|-
|1977
|You've Come a Long Way, Baby|rowspan="4"|Mercury
|align="center"|
|align="center"|
|align="center"|
|align="center"| -
|-
|1978
|All About Esther|align="center"|
|align="center"|
|align="center"|
|align="center"| -
|-
|1979
|Here's Esther, Are You Ready|align="center"|
|align="center"|47
|align="center"|
|align="center"| -
|-
|1981
|Good Black Is Hard to Crack|align="center"|
|align="center"|
|align="center"|
|align="center"| -
|-
|1986
|A Way to Say Goodbye|Muse (Compilation).
|align="center"|
|align="center"|
|align="center"|
|align="center"| -
|}

 Singles 

Notes: *With the Johnny Otis Orchestra. **With Big Al Downing. ***"What a Diff'rence a Day Makes" also reached number 2 on the US Dance chart. Another two-sided single, "Magic's In the Air" / "Boy I Really Tied One On", peaked at number 5 on the same chart in 1976.

 Complete singles for Federal Records, 1951–1953 
All released on 45- and 78-rpm records
1951
Federal 12016, "The Deacon Moves In" (with the Dominoes) / "Other Lips, Other Arms"
Federal 12023, "I'm a Bad, Bad Girl" / "Don't Make a Fool Out of Me"
Federal 12036, "Lookin' for a Man to Satisfy My Soul" / "Heart to Heart" (with The Dominoes)
Federal 12042, "Cryin' and Singin' the Blues" / "Tell Him That I Need Him"
1952
Federal 12055, "Ring-a-Ding-Doo" (with Bobby Nunn) / "The Cryin' Blues"
Federal 12063, "Summertime" / "The Storm"
Federal 12065, "Better Beware" / "I'll Be There"
Federal 12078, "Aged and Mellow" / "Bring My Lovin' Back to Me"
Federal 12090, "Ramblin' Blues" / "Somebody New"
Federal 12100, "Mainliner" (with 4 Jacks) / "Saturday Night Daddy" (with Bobby Nunn)
1953
Federal 12108, "Last Laugh Blues" (with Little Willie Littlefield) / "Flesh, Blood and Bones"
Federal 12115, "Turn The Lamp Down Low" (with Little Willie Littlefield) / "Hollerin' and Screamin'"
Federal 12122, "You Took My Love Too Fast" (with Bobby Nunn) / "Street Lights"
Federal 12126, "Hound Dog" / "Sweet Lips"
Federal 12142, "Cherry Wine" / "Love Oh Love"Taken from the original logbooks of the defunct Federal Records, which I copied decades ago.I?

 Filmography 
Television
 1965: The Music of Lennon & McCartney, musical guest
 1970: The Barbara McNair Show, musical guest
 1970: The Tonight Show Starring Johnny Carson, musical guest
 1975: Saturday Night Live, musical guest

 1975: Soul Train'', Musical Guest

References

External links 
 [ Allmusic biography]
 

1935 births
1984 deaths
People from Galveston, Texas
American rhythm and blues singers
Drug-related deaths in California
Atlantic Records artists
Jazz-blues musicians
Modern Records artists
Mercury Records artists
Muse Records artists
Singers from Texas
Singers from California
Burials at Forest Lawn Memorial Park (Hollywood Hills)
20th-century American singers
20th-century American women singers
CTI Records artists